Mambet Kulzhabayuly Koigeldiev (Mámbet Quljabaıuly Qoıgeldıev; born 18 August 1947) is a Kazakh historian, Doctor of Historical Sciences, professor, Full Member of the Kazakhstan National Academy of Science. He also serves as a President of Association of Historians of Kazakhstan He specializes in Alash Orda, Alash movement.

Biography

Early life

Career
School teacher and researcher at Zhambyl Region's Archive (1969-1971); 
Lecturer at Kazakh State University (1971-1989);
Senior Researcher at Institute of Party under Central Committee of Communist Party of Kazakhstan;
Head of the Modern History of Kazakhstan Department at Kazakh National University, Director of Continuing Education Department at Kazakh National University, Dean of History Department at Kazakh National University (1991-2001);
Director of Institute of History and Ethnology under the Ministry of Education and Science of Kazakhstan (2002-2006);
Head of the History Department at Kazakh National Pedagogical University (2006–present time)

Selected publications

Footnotes

1947 births
Living people
Kazakhstani historians
Kyrgyz National University alumni
Academic staff of Al-Farabi Kazakh National University
People from Jambyl Region